Cleistochloa is a genus of bunchgrasses in the family Poaceae, found in southwestern in Oceania.

They are native to Australia and New Guinea (island).

Species
Species include:
 Cleistochloa rigida (S.T.Blake) Clayton - Queensland, New South Wales
 Cleistochloa sclerachne (F.M.Bailey) C.E.Hubb. - Queensland, New Guinea
 Cleistochloa subjuncea C.E.Hubb. - Queensland, New South Wales

References

Panicoideae
Bunchgrasses of Australasia
Flora of New Guinea
Poaceae genera
Taxa named by Charles Edward Hubbard